is a Japanese voice actress affiliated with VIMS.

Personal life
Yamamoto married in January 2020. In January 2023, Yamamoto announced her pregnancy.

Voice acting roles

Anime television series
2011
Haganai as Yukimura Kusunoki
Un-Go as Rie Kaishō

2012
Girls und Panzer as Satoko Nakajima
Joshiraku as Tetora Bōhatei
K as Sakura AsamaSword Art Online as Announcer; YolkoTsuritama as Erika Usami

2013Arpeggio of Blue Steel ~Ars Nova~ as I-402Haganai NEXT as Yukimura KusunokiGenshiken Nidaime as Chika OgiueLove Live! as FumikoPretty Rhythm: Rainbow Live as Ai Jōzenji, Coolun, Cosmo Hōjō, SexinySunday Without God as MuuSuper Seisyun Brothers as Shinmoto ChikoTanken Driland: Sennen no Mahō as Beast Goddess Gracia

2014Captain Earth as AiPriPara as Cosmo HōjōWake Up, Girls! as Moka SuzukiA Good Librarian Like a Good Shepherd as Senri MisonoYona of the Dawn as Sū Won (young), Ao

2015Absolute Duo as Julie SigtunaSky Wizards Academy as Misora WhitaleThe Idolmaster Cinderella Girls as Rika JōgasakiUtawarerumono: The False Faces as Nosuri

2016Aokana: Four Rhythm Across the Blue as Mashiro ArisakaSchwarzesmarken as Irisdina Bernhard

2017Schoolgirl Strikers as Ryoko ShinonomeA Sister's All You Need as Chihiro Hashima

2018Senran Kagura Shinovi Master as Rasetsu

2019Why the Hell are You Here, Teacher!? as Chizuru Tachibana

2020 Hypnosis Mic: Division Rap Battle: Rhyme Anima as Nemu Aohitsugi

2021Gekidol as Aki AsagiGunma-chan as Kiryū-san

2022Utawarerumono: Mask of Truth as Nosuri

 Original video animation (OVA) 
2011Boku wa Tomodachi ga Sukunai as Yukimura Kusunoki
2021Alice in Deadly School as Yumiya Akashima

Anime moviesWake Up, Girls! - Seven Idols as Moka SuzukiLaid-Back Camp Movie as Shizuka Kagamihara

Video GamesGranblue Fantasy as RaziaGirls' Frontline as AR70, EVO 3, G28Schoolgirl Strikers as Ryoko Shinonome Secret of Mana (2018) as PrimmYuki Yuna is a Hero: Hanayui no Kirameki as Natsume KohaguraAzur Lane as Wichita, Hornet, AkatsukiYs VIII: Lacrimosa of Dana as RicottaSid Story as ChaerinArknights as EstelleUma Musume Pretty Derby as Yukino BijinNo More Heroes III as Kimmy Love / Dr. JuvenileBlaster Master Zero 3 as Jennifer GardnerThe Legend of Heroes: Kuro no Kiseki as ViolaHonkai Impact 3rd as PardofelisOmega Labyrinth Life as Juri Minase

DubbingCrisis on Earth-X'' as Amaya Jiwe / Vixen (Maisie Richardson-Sellers)

References

External links

Japanese voice actresses
Living people
People from Misawa, Aomori
Voice actresses from Aomori Prefecture
1988 births
21st-century Japanese actresses